Ground Mobile Forces (GMF) is the term given to the tactical SATCOM portion of the Joint Service program called TRI-TAC developed by GTE-Sylvania in the mid-1970s. The Tri-Service Tactical signal system is a tactical command, control, and communications program. It is a joint service effort to develop and field advanced tactical and multichannel switched communications equipment. The program was conceived to achieve interoperability between service tactical communications systems, establish interoperability with strategic communications systems, take advantage of advances in technology, and eliminate duplication in service acquisitions.

Specifications
GMF is configured in a hub-spoke arrangement with the hub terminal being able to ingest four feeds from the outlying spoke terminals. Of the four designated GMF terminals, the AN/TSC-85B and AN/TSC-100A are equipped for point-to-point or hub operations and the AN/TSC-93B and AN/TSC-94A are spoke terminals.

The 85B/100A hubs are capable of ingesting up to 48 multiplexed and encrypted channels from a maximum of four spoke terminals simultaneously, but can double that capability with an external multiplexer (96 channels). Each channel is configured for 16 or 32kbit/s, which with overhead translates to 48kbit/s true capacity. The 93B/94A terminals have a capacity of 24 16/32kbit/s multiplexed channels. All of the GMF terminals have external connections for an AN/TSQ-111 Tech Control Facility, field phones, or a  IF wideband input, plus are sealed for sustained operations in a chemical/biological/radiological (CBR) environment.

GMF communicates via Super High Frequency (SHF) X-band Defense Satellite Communication System (DSCS) satellites. Quick Reaction Satellite Antenna Group (QRSAG) antenna, while the outlying spoke terminals rely on an  parabolic dish antenna.

Obsolescence
Today, much of the TRI-TAC and GMF equipment is obsolete – its bulky circuit-switched equipment having been replaced in the last decade by fly-away quad-band systems containing compact IP-based routers, switches, and encryption equipment. There are, however, a number of GMF terminals still supporting active forces in the extreme operating conditions of Iraq and Afghanistan.

References

Further reading

Communications satellites